Becoming Nancy is a musical with a book by Elliot Davis, music by George Stiles and lyrics by Anthony Drewe. It is based on the 2011 debut novel of the same name by composer Terry Ronald.

The musical received mixed reviews from critics during the run in Atlanta.

Synopsis 
The musical is a coming-of-age story set in the south east suburb of East Dulwich, London in 1979 about a school boy, David Starr, who is cast as Nancy in a school production of the musical Oliver!

Production history 
The musical made its world premiere at the Alliance Theatre, Atlanta, Georgia from September 6 to October 6, 2019. The production was directed and choreographed by Jerry Mitchell with scenic design by David Rockwell, costume design by Amy Clark, lighting design by Phillip S. Rosenberg and sound design by John Shivers.

Cast and characters

External links 
 Official website

References 

2019 musicals
Musicals based on novels
Musicals set in London